James Hoban Sands (born July 6, 2000) is an American professional soccer player who plays as a center-back or defensive midfielder for Major League Soccer club New York City FC. He became NYCFC's first ever homegrown player in July 2017.

Youth career 
Sands joined New York Soccer Club, an affiliate team of New York City FC, at the age of 10. In 2015, he joined New York City after the inception of the Under-16 Academy side, alongside his twin brother, Will Sands. Sands credits English coach Chris Leaver as his most influential and important mentor of his youth career.

Club career

New York City 
In January 2017, Sands became the first Academy player to be included in the New York City FC roster for pre-season. On June 27, 2017, he signed his first professional contract to begin on July 1. The deal made him the club's first ever homegrown player. Sands made his professional debut on September 16, 2017, coming on as a substitute for Andrea Pirlo in a 1–1 draw against Colorado Rapids.

In 2019, Sands became a regular starter for NYCFC, first as a defensive midfielder, and then as the central defender in a three-man back line once the Pigeons switched formations. In 2021, he started in MLS Cup 2021, in which New York City FC defeated the Portland Timbers in a penalty shootout to win their first ever MLS Cup.

Louisville City 
In 2018, Sands joined Louisville City in the second-division USL on a short-term loan from August 15 through September 1. Sands worked in Louisville under John Hackworth, who had previously coached Sands with the United States U17 team.

Rangers 
On January 5, 2022, Sands joined Scottish Premiership side Rangers on an initial 18-month loan deal with an option to buy. On January 18, he made his Rangers debut during a 1–1 draw with Aberdeen. He made a substitute appearance in the 2022 UEFA Europa League final in which Rangers lost to Eintracht Frankfurt in a penalty shootout. On March 1, 2023, his loan was terminated and he returned to New York City FC.

International career 
Sands regularly featured for the United States under-17s in 2017 and helped his nation finish second in the CONCACAF Under-17 Championship in May. The United States eventually lost to Mexico in a penalty shootout, although Sands scored and was named to the "Team of the Tournament."

In July 2021, Sands was called up to the senior team for the 2021 CONCACAF Gold Cup and made his debut against Haiti as a substitute. He started in the final game of the tournament, in which the United States defeated Mexico 1-0.

Career statistics

Club

International

Honors 
Louisville City FC
USL Cup: 2018

New York City FC
MLS Cup: 2021

Rangers
Scottish Cup: 2021–22
UEFA Europa League runner-up: 2021–22

United States
CONCACAF Gold Cup: 2021

Individual
CONCACAF Under-17 Championship Team of the Tournament: 2017
MLS All-Star: 2021

References

External links
 
 NYCFC bio

2000 births
Living people
American soccer players
Association football midfielders
Homegrown Players (MLS)
Louisville City FC players
Major League Soccer players
New York City FC players
People from Rye, New York
Soccer players from New York (state)
Sportspeople from Westchester County, New York
United States men's youth international soccer players
2021 CONCACAF Gold Cup players
Association football defenders
United States men's international soccer players
CONCACAF Gold Cup-winning players
American expatriate sportspeople in Scotland
Scottish Professional Football League players
Rangers F.C. players
American expatriate soccer players
Expatriate footballers in Scotland